Mehul Surti (born 1977) in an Indian music composer and singer from Surat, Gujarat, India, known for his work in Gujarati cinema and Gujarati theatre. He has composed music for several successful Gujarati films including Kevi Rite Jaish (2012), Vitamin She (2017), Montu Ni Bittu (2019), Short Circuit (2019), and Hellaro (2019).

Early life
He was born on 16 November 1977 to Dhansukhlal Surti, a doctor, and Manjulaben Surti, a teacher. After his school education, he joined a diploma in Mechanical Engineering, which he left incomplete. He is trained in the musical tradition of Kirana gharana and Mewati gharana.

Career
He started his career as the music director at the age of 22 by composing songs for the 1999 Gujarati film Narmada Tara Vahi Jata Pani, directed by Kirit Panwalla. He later composed music for several Gujarati films including Kevi Rite Jaish (2012), Aapne to Dhirubhai (2014), Je Pan Kahish E Sachuj Kahish (2016), Passport (2016), Kookh (2016), Vitamin She (2017), Montu Ni Bittu (2019), Short Circuit (2019), and National Film Award winning film Hellaro (2019). For Hellaro, he won GIFA -Gujarati Iconic Film Award in two categories: Best Music Director and Best Background Score.

He has composed background score for several plays which include Priya Pappa have To, Aakhar Ni Aatmakatha, Khelando, Koi Pan Ek Phoolnu Naam Bolo To, Samudramanthan and Dhaad. He has composed over 200 poems of various Gujarati poets including Narmad, Umashankar Joshi, Ardeshar Khabardar, Mareez, Jayant Pathak, Mukul Choksi, and Saumya Joshi.

Filmography
As a music director:
 Narmada Tara Vahi Jata Pani (2002)
 Kevi Rite Jaish (2012)
 Aapne to Dhirubhai (2014)
 Je Pan Kahish E Sachuj Kahish (2016)
 Passport (2016)
 Kookh (2016)
 Vitamin She (2017)
 Montu Ni Bittu (2019)
 Hellaro (2019)
 Short Circuit (2019)
 21mu Tiffin (2021)

Albums
The albums he has released include:
 Narmad dhara (poetry of Narmad)
 Prem Shaurya Gujarat
 Saaraansh
 Saatatya
 Hasta Ramta
 Adadhi Ramat Thi

Accolades

References

External links

1977 births
Singers from Gujarat
Gujarati-language singers
Musicians from Gujarat
People from Surat
Living people